Salt of the Earth is the second album by the Washington, D.C.-based group The Soul Searchers.

Reception

Released in 1974, this album has become one of the most sampled albums in hip hop music with the drum break from "Ashley's Roachclip" being the basis of many popular songs of the past thirty years.

Track listing

Side A
"I Rolled It You Hold It" (John Buchanan) – 4:38	
"Blow Your Whistle" (Maxx Kidd, Chuck Brown) – 3:01	
"Close To You" (Burt Bacharach, Hal David) – 4:23
"Funk to the Folks" (John Buchanan) – 4:14

Side B
"Ain't It Heavy" (John Buchanan) – 5:58
"Windsong" (John Buchanan) – 5:00
"Ashley's Roachclip" (Lloyd Pinchback) – 5:36
"We Share" (Donald Tillery, John Buchanan) – 2:49
"If It Ain't Funky" (Chuck Brown) – 3:39

Personnel 
The Soul Searchers
Chuck Brown – electric guitar, lead vocals
John "J.B." Buchanan – trombone, piano, synthesizer, percussion, vocals
Donald Tillery – trumpet, percussion, vocals
John Euwell – bass guitar
Kenneth Scoggins – drums, percussion
Lino Druitt – congas, bongos, percussion
Lloyd Pinchback – flute, saxophone, percussion
Bennie Braxton – organ, vocals
Technical
Carl Overr - art direction
Ed Mell - cover illustration

Samples
Eric B. & Rakim sampled "Ashley's Roachclip" on their song "Paid In Full" on their album Paid In Full in 1987.
LL Cool J sampled "Ashley's Roachclip" on his song "Jack The Ripper" on the B-Side of his 12" "Going Back to Cali" single in 1988.
Run–D.M.C. sampled "Ashley's Roachclip" on their song "Run's House" on their album Tougher Than Leather in 1988.
Public Enemy sampled "Blow Your Whistle" on their song "Who Stole the Soul?" on their album Fear of a Black Planet in 1990.
2Pac sampled "We Share" on his song "Old School" on his album Me Against the World in 1995.
Eve sampled "Blow Your Whistle" on her song "Tambourine" on her single in 2007.
Lloyd featuring Lil Wayne sampled "Ashley's Roachclip" on his song "Girls Around the World" on his album Lessons in Love in 2008.

References

External links
 Salt of the Earth at Discogs

1974 albums
Chuck Brown albums
Jazz-funk albums
Sussex Records albums